Nansio is a small Tanzanian port town and capital of Ukerewe District in Mwanza Region. The town is also a ward on the island of Ukerewe, Lake Victoria, in Tanzanian lake territory. Nansio is a port of entry for passenger and freight shipping services from the city of Mwanza.

The ward of Nansio is one of twenty-four in the district of Ukerewe. In 2016 the Tanzania National Bureau of Statistics reported there were 8,644 people in the ward, up from 7,674 in 2012.

Villages 
The ward has 15 villages.

 Namagubo “A”
 Namagubo “B”
 Barazani
 Posta “A”
 Posta “B”
 Mashine ya Maji
 Mdoe

References

Populated places in Mwanza Region